The Republic of Poljica or duchy (in older form Poljička knežija) was an autonomous community which existed in the late Middle Ages and the early modern period in central Dalmatia, near modern-day Omiš, Croatia.

It was organized as a "peasants' republic" and is best known because of the Poljica Statute.

Etymology

The name poljica stems from the word polje for "field", karst polje in particular, a common geographic feature in the area. The Poljica region was first titled a "republic" by the Venetian writer Alberto Fortis in 1774. It was also known as Poglizza (in Italian).

Legal system

Poljica is best known for the eponymous statute from the 15th century. The oldest preserved revision is from 1440, it refers to an older one and was further revised in 1485, 1515, 1665, and on several occasions up to the 19th century, growing to 116 articles. It is today kept in Omiš's museum. This document contains a description of the Poljica common law and its system of government, and is one of the most important Croatian historical legal statutes (together with the Vinodol codex of 1288), written in a mixture of Chakavian and Shtokavian dialects, and in Cyrillic (the name appears in the annex of the Statute of Poljica from 1655) ( and ).

One of the items of the Poljica Statute states that "everyone has the right to live", contrary to many mediaeval European laws replete with capital punishments including torture.

A number of other documents dated from the 12th to 17th century regarding the republic have been preserved, such as Poljički molitvenik (1614) and Statut poljičke bratovštine Sv.Kuzme i Damjana (1619).

Geography

The territories of the Republic of Poljica lay chiefly within the south-easterly curve made by the river Cetina before it enters the Adriatic at Omiš. They also comprised the fastnesses of the Mosor mountain (1,370 m or 4,500 feet) and the fertile strip of coast from Omiš to Stobreč,  W.N.W.

Poljica is divided into three zones: Upper Poljica (Zagorska), behind Mosor, is farthest from the Adriatic Sea and is in the hinterland of Mosor; Middle Poljica (Zavrska), the largest part of Poljica (50%) extends from the Žrnovnica River to the Cetina River at Zadvarje; Lower Poljica (Primorska), built on the remnants of the ancient Greek colony Eqetium, which extends along the sea from Omiš to the village of Stobreč.

History

The people of Poljica organized and founded the "parish commune" where they could live according to their own laws. The parish commune was divided into twelve villages (katuni), which they named after twelve larger villages of Poljica: 
(Upper) Gornja Poljica: Srijane, Dolac Donji and Gornje Polje 
(Middle) Sridnja Poljica: Kostanje, Zvečanje, Čišla, Gata, Dubrava, Sitno and Srinjine 
(Lower) Donja Poljica: Duće, Jesenice and Podstrana

Five of the twelve villages were greatly populated by free peasants from Split origin, and are therefore called free peasant composite villages. The other composite villages were populated by descendants of the three brothers (noted to be founders of Poljica). Each of the twelve villages elected an elder, or little duke (knez), to serve as leader. The little dukes of free peasant composite villages did not share the same rights as little dukes of the other villages—they could vote, but not be elected to the government of Poljica due to their ties with Split.

The inhabitants lived in scattered villages, twelve of them, each ruled by its count, and all together ruled by the supreme count. These officers, with the three judges, were always of noble birth, though elected by the whole body of citizens. There were two orders of nobles: but because both noble groups were Croats, and to distinguish them from the original nobles "didići", the later from mid-14th century got nickname "ugričići" after the assumption that they came from the areas under control of Kingdom of Hungary. Didići according to legends are the descendants of three sons of King Miroslav of Croatia (each of them forming a tribe of Tišimiri, Limići and Kremenićani), and were "koljenovići", as they had rights on lands ("didovina"). Vlastela could become the part of "poljički stol", but they needed the confirmation of the assembly of Poljica nobles. The descendants of the office holders were allowed to use titles of duke and count. Below these ranked the commoners and the serfs. At a very early date the warlike highlanders of Poljica became the friends and allies of the Omiš corsairs, who were thus enabled to harass the seaborne trade of their neighbors without fear of a sudden attack by land.

Omiš received a charter from Andrew II of Hungary in 1207, and remained under the nominal protection of Hungary until 1444, when both Omiš and Poljica accepted the suzerainty of Venice, while retaining their internal freedom.

The occupation of Bosnia as well as by the Ottoman Empire gravely impacted the Republic of Poljica. Notable battles were fought by the local forces against the Turks in 1530 and 1686, and in both occasions the Ottoman army was repelled. A local young woman by the name of Mila Gojsalić became a heroine after sacrificing herself for the good of the Poljica community in one of the conflicts with the Turks—she infiltrated the Turkish camp and blew up the munitions stockpile. A statue of Mila Gojsalić by Ivan Meštrović stands in Poljica overlooking the mouth of Cetina, and the story was also made into a theatre play.

After the fall of the Venetian Republic in 1797, Poljica was taken over by Austria. The population of Poljica numbered 6,566 in 1806. In the following year, however, the republic incurred the enmity of Napoleon by rendering aid to the Russians and Montenegrins in Dalmatia, and it was invaded by French troops, who plundered its villages, massacred its inhabitants, and finally deprived it of independence.

After the Napoleonic era, Poljica was absorbed by Austria.

Legacy

Poljica area were also important to Croatian national renaissance on Croatian South, because the votes from Poljica contributed a lot to the victory of the People's Party (Narodna stranka, the Croatian unionist party) in 1882 on the elections in Split county, bringing the pro-Croat forces on ruling level.

It since passed to Yugoslavia, and in 1912, the Poljica region was reconstituted as a single municipality. In 1945, it was split again between several municipalities, and remained that way until the present day, when the villages are part of Croatian municipalities of Omiš, Podstrana, Dugi Rat and Split.

Recently the republic was "re-established" as a cultural organization. The reigning prince (veliki knez) is elected once a year and Petar Rodić was re-elected several times.

Rulers of the Principality of Poljica 

The title of the rulers of the Principality of Poljica was župan (count) at first, later changing to knez (prince) and finally veliki knez (grand prince).

Župans

 Dalizio (Dališ) 1070
 Visen (Uisono) 1076, 1078
 Vratina (Uratina) 1088
 Kačić, c 12th century
 Gregor Ivanišević 1120
 Domaso Papalli 1144
 Alberti 1145
 Michiel Francesco Ivancichio 1146
 Comulli Petracca 1148
 Lovretić 1149
 Ivan Papalli 1200

Princes

 Tolen 1239
 The Counts Šubić ruled over Poljica at the end of the 13th century.
 Mladen II Šubić of Bribir 1322
 Gregor Jurinić 1328
 Jure Rajčić between 1342 and 1350
 Dražoe, Lord of Kamengrad 1350

Grand princes in the period 1444–1482

 Grisogono
 Cindro
 Alberti
 Petracca
 Dujam Papalić (Papalli)

Grand princes

 Arnerio Lovretić 1451
 Žane Žanić 1454
 Mijo Pocolić (also known as Kulišić) 1458
 Matija Tusčević Scinsić 1459
 Komula Vitković 1461
 Dujam Papalić 1468
 Stipan Mikulić c. 1469
 Dujam Maričić 1479
 Dujam Papalić 1482 – 1483
 Ivan Petrović October 1499 – March 1500
 Marian Gregolić 1500
 Augustin Maričić 15 February 1503 – January or February 1504 
 Ivan Jovanović 1504 – 1511
 Ivaniš Nenada Dražoević 1511 – 1546
 Ivan Augustinović (Dražoević) veliki knez five times in the period 1512 – 1537
 Jure Pavić March 1537
 Radoš Sladoević 1541
 Ivan Augustinović (Dražoević) 1546 – 1567
 Augustin Maričić 1555
 Nikola Sudgić 1567 – 1581
 Stipan Mikulić (Nikolić, Dražoević) 1581 – 1605
 Pavo Pavić 1596
 Jure Pavić 1607 – 1609
 Radoš Sudgić 1609 – 1626
 Nikola Gojaković 1619
 Ivan Sikić 1620
 Jure Sinovčić 1626 – 1628
 Pavo Sudgić 1628 – 1632
 Jure Pavić 1632 – 1655
 Stipan Bobetić 8 March 1652
 Jure Sinovčić 1655 – 1676
 Pavo Sučić 1676 – 1678
 Ivaniš Novaković 1678 – 1684
 Luka Sinovčić 1684 – 1701
 Marko Barić 1701 – 1704
 Marko Sinovčić 1704 – 1708
 Ivan Sinovčić 14 September 1706
 Jure Novaković 24 November 1707 
 Marko Barić 1708 – 1710
 Ivan Barić 1710 – 1712
 Petar Barić 11 August 1711 
 Marko Barić 1712 – 1716
 Ivan Sinovčić 1716 – 1717
 Ivan Barić 1717 – 1721
 Ivan Novaković 1721 – 1732
 Pavo Pavić 28 October 1728
 Petar Sinovčić 1732 – 1740
 Marko Barić 1740 – 1742
 Ivan Novaković 1742 – 1747
 Marko Barić 1747 – 1760
 Ivan Pavić 20 July 1756
 Jure Novaković 1760 – 1768
 Frano Pavić 1766 – 1768
 Ivan Jerončić 1768 – 1771
 Frano Pavić 1770 – 1777
 Ivan Jerončić 1777 – 1778
 Andrija Barić 1778 – 1783
 Jure Novaković 1783 – 1789
 Ivan Sičić 1789
 Matija Kružičević 1793
 Frano Pavić 9 September 1796
 Frano Gojselić 24 February 1796

Grand princes during the period of the Austrian occupation of Dalmatia

 Marko Žuljević 18 November 1797 – 25 March 1798
 Matija Mianović 21 May 1799 – 1 December 1801
 Ivan Čović 23 April 1803 – 1806

Grand princes during the period of the French occupation of Dalmatia

 Ivan Čović until 10 June 1807, when the Principality of Poljica was abolished by the French.

Notes

References
Domljan, Žarko (ed); Omiš i Poljica, Naklada Ljevak, Zagreb, 2006., 

Mimica, Bože ; Omiška krajina Poljica makarsko primorje. Od antike do 1918. godine, Rijeka, 2003. 

 The 1911 Encyclopædia Britannica, in turn, gives the following references:
 Annuario Dalmatico for 1885 (published at Zadar)
 Fortis, A; Travels into Dalmatia, London, 1778
 Alfons Pavich v. Pfauenthal, Beiträge zur Geschichte der Republik Poljica bei Spalato mit besonderer Rücksicht auf die Reihenfolge der Veliki Knezen (Staatsoberhäupter), in Wissenschaftliche Mitteilungen aus Bosnien und der Herzegowina, 10. vol. Moriz Hoernes (ed.), Vienna, 1907, pp. 156–345.

External links
History of the Republic of Poljica
Map of the Republic of Poljica

History of Dalmatia
Omiš